The Halifax child sex abuse ring was a group of men who committed serious sexual offences against under-aged girls in the English town of Halifax and city of Bradford, West Yorkshire.  It was the largest child sexual exploitation investigation in the United Kingdom.  In 2016, the perpetrators were found guilty of rape and other crimes in several separate trials at Leeds Crown Court. In total, as many as a hundred men may have been involved in child abuse. Twenty-five suspects were charged by West Yorkshire Police and the Crown Prosecution Service and 18 of these were found guilty, totalling over 175 years of prison time. A further nine men were convicted in February 2019 for grooming two underage girls in Bradford and sentenced to over 130 years in prison. The majority of those charged and later convicted come from the town's Asian community; there were fears that their arrests might impact race relations in the town.

In December 2017, Quilliam released a report entitled "Group Based Child Sexual Exploitation – Dissecting Grooming Gangs", concluding that 84% of offenders were of South Asian heritage. This review was criticised for its alleged poor methodology by Ella Cockbain and Waqas Tufail, in their paper "Failing victims, fuelling hate: challenging the harms of the 'Muslim grooming gangs' narrative" which was published in January 2020. In December that year, a further report by the Home Office was released, showing that the majority of CSE gangs were, in fact, composed of white men. However it was also found that some studies suggest an over-representation of Black and Asian offenders relative to the demographics of national populations.

Writing in The Guardian, Cockbain and Tufail wrote of the report that "The two-year study by the Home Office makes very clear that there are no grounds for asserting that Muslim or Pakistani-heritage men are disproportionately engaged in such crimes, and, citing our research, it confirmed the unreliability of the Quilliam claim".

Crimes

The principal victim was identified as "Jeanette" in government reports. The prosecution said that the girl, who was 13 when the abuse first began, came from a troubled family background and was “lonely [and] needy”. The gang exploited her desire for friendship and love, deliberately giving her drink and drugs to turn her into an addict and make her more easily controlled. In interviews with the police, she described being raped and abused in many different locations, including private homes in Halifax, Bradford and Manchester, and hotels in Bradford, Leeds and London.  The abuse took place between 2006 and 2011.

"Jeanette" believed that she was abused by at least a hundred men, often more than once a day and once by nineteen men over a short time. She was infected with gonorrhoea as result of the abuse and suffered permanent psychological harm. Although she knew many of the men only by their nicknames, the police were able to identify them using CCTV footage from the hotels in which she was abused and by analysing male DNA in stains found on her clothing.

Police said it was the largest child sexual exploitation investigation in the country – "bigger than high profile cases in Rochdale and Rotherham."

Calderdale board report and West Yorkshire police apology
The November 2016 board report found that three agencies failed to protect "Jeanette".  West Yorkshire police apologized, saying "We would firstly like to apologise to the victim for the failings of West Yorkshire police."

Legal 
The gang members were arrested in May 2013.  There were three separate trials in the first half of 2016.  Thirteen men received prison sentences adding up to over 150 years.

Judge's comments

Judge Geoffrey Marson QC harshly criticised the guilty men for committing gross abuse on obviously vulnerable girls. He condemned them for not showing “the slightest remorse” for their behaviour and for the way in which they had inflicted pain, humiliation and degradation on a victim whom they had deliberately incapacitated with drink and drugs. He said that they had inflicted permanent psychological harm on the girl, acting without concern or feelings for anything but their own sexual gratification.

2018 arrests for same case
In early January 2018, 20 additional men were arrested as a result of investigations into the same case.

Verdicts and sentences

Those found guilty in June 2016 and their sentences were as follows:

Hedar Ali, 36, of Bradford, 25 years for rape and trafficking for sexual exploitation
Haider Ali, 41, of Halifax, 20 years for sexual activity with a child and causing a person to engage in sexual activity
Khalid Zaman, 38, of Bradford, 17 and a half years for rape and supplying class B drugs
Mohammed Ramzan, 35, of Bradford, 15 years for rape
Haaris Ahmed, 32, of Halifax, 12 and a half years for sexual activity with a child and supplying class B drugs
Tahir Mahmood, 43, of Halifax, 11 years for sexual activity with a child and sexual assault
Taukeer Butt, 31, of Halifax, 10 years for sexual activity with a child
Amaar Ali Ditta, 27, of Halifax, nine years for sexual activity with a child
Azeem Subhani, 25, of Halifax, nine years for sexual activity with a child
Talib Saddiq, 31, of Halifax, eight years for sexual activity with a child
Sikander Malik, 31, of Halifax, seven years for sexual activity with a child
Mohammed Ali Ahmed, 43, of Halifax, six and a half years for sexual activity with a child
Aftab Hussain, 37, of Halifax, six years for sexual activity with a child
Mansoor Akhtar, 25, of Huddersfield, six years for sexual activity with a child and supplying Class B drugs
Sikander Ishaq, 31, of Halifax, six years for sexual activity with a child
Aesan Pervez, 27, from Halifax, four years. Convicted by a jury after a trial at Leeds Crown Court on one charge of sexual assault on the girl
Furqaan Ghafar, 31, from Derby who was jailed for five years three months after he admitted one charge of sexual activity with a child.

An 18th member of the ring was jailed for 10 months for supplying class B drugs

Those found guilty in February 2019 and their sentences were as follows:

 Saeed Akhtar, 55, of Bradford, 20 years for two counts of inciting child prostitution and rape
 Basharat Khaliq, 38, of Bradford, 20 years for five counts of rape and assault by penetration
 Parvaze Ahmed, 36, of Bradford, 17 years for three counts of rape
 Naveed Akhtar, 43, of Bradford, 17 years for two counts of rape
 Kieran Harris, 28, of Dewsbury, 17 years for two counts of rape
 Mohammed Usman, 31, of Bradford, 17 years for two counts of rape
 Izar Hussain, 32, of Bradford, 16 years for rape and attempted rape
 Faheem Iqbal, 27, of no fixed abode, 7 years for aiding and abetting rape
 Zeeshan Ali, 32, of Bradford, 18 months for sexual assault

See also
List of sexual abuses perpetrated by groups

References

2000s crimes in the United Kingdom
2000s in West Yorkshire
2010s crimes in the United Kingdom
2010s in West Yorkshire
2010s trials
British people convicted of child sexual abuse
Child prostitution in the United Kingdom
Crime in West Yorkshire
Forced prostitution
Rape in the 2000s
Rape in the 2010s
Rape in Yorkshire
Sex crime trials
Sex gangs
Trials in England
Incidents of violence against girls